Buffalo worm as a trade name may refer to:

 Alphitobius diaperinus in larval state as feed or food
 Alphitobius laevigatus in larval state as feed